Pyramis Group  is a Greek multinational kitchen products corporation, headquartered in Thessaloniki, Greece.

History

The Decade of Establishment: 1959–1968
In 1959, Alexandros Bakatselos, Chairman of Pyramis, opened a small workshop specialising in metal-framed furniture. By the end of the decade, in 1968, he founded Pyramis A.E. and started to manufacture stainless steel sinks for the domestic market.

The Decade of Property Growth: 1969–1978
The company moved to its current 286,000m² location, just outside Thessaloniki ; Greece's’ second city. In 1972, a further production unit was added to develop stainless steel cookware.

The Decade of Exports Orientation: 1979–1988
By now, Pyramis was already the market leader of stainless steel cookware and sinks in Greece. A strategic decision was made to export goods to the international marketplace, focusing on Europe in the main, and this derived immediate success with exponential growth.

The Decade of International Sales Growth: 1989–1998
By the 4th decade of the business, sales for Pyramis products had doubled because of the International export market. In order to facilitate the increased demand, the company installed a new production line for monoblock sinks.

The Decade of Accomplishments: 1999–2008
The 5th decade has encompassed the decade of accomplishments. During this period the company began building the Pyramis brand as opposed to offering own label products and has since concentrated its market in the premium goods sector. From the 1999 establishment of its first subsidiary in Poland, today 70% of the company’s annual turnover is achieved from exports. Pyramis now has an efficient export sales network in more than 50 countries worldwide, and eight commercial subsidiaries in Europe and the Middle East.

Corporate structure
Pyramis Group has its headquarters in Liti (in Thessaloniki, Greece).
The Department of Sales in Greece is incorporated in the mother company, Pyramis Metallourgia A.E.
Sales to other countries are either through subsidiary companies to those (or neighbouring countries), or directly from the mother company to importers/distributors/wholesalers/kitchen-manufactures in those countries.

Products
Kitchen
 Stainless steel sinks
 Composite sinks
 Minikitchens and Pantries
 Faucets
 Cookerhoods
 Hobs (electric, vitro-ceramic, gas)
 Fridges
 Ovens
 Microwave ovens
 Dish-washers

Bathroom
 Bathtubs
 Faucets
 Hydro-massage systems

Corporate affairs

Historical logos

Corporate culture
The official business language of Pyramis is English.

References

External links
Official Pyramis portal

Home appliance manufacturers of Greece
Kitchenware brands
Home appliance brands
Manufacturing companies based in Thessaloniki
Manufacturing companies established in 1959
Multinational companies headquartered in Greece
Greek brands
Greek companies established in 1959